Black Island may refer to:

Places

Antarctica
 Black Island (Ross Archipelago)
 Black Island (Wilhelm Archipelago)

Asia
 Black Island (Calamian Group), Palawan, Philippines
 Kunashir Island, possibly meaning Black Island, Kuril Islands
 Kuroshima (Okinawa) (Black Island), Japan

Europe
Black Island Platform railway station, in an area known as the Black Island, Blair Atholl, Scotland
Black Island, County Down, a townland in County Down, Northern Ireland
Black Island, Dartrey Forest, County Monaghan, Ireland
Duvillaun (Black Island), North Mayo, Ireland
Pico Island, traditionally Black Island, Azores

North America
 Black Island (Bahamas), an island of the Bahamas
 Black Island, Friday Bay, Newfoundland and Labrador, Canada
 Black Island, Hecla-Grindstone Provincial Park, Manitoba, Canada
 Black Island (Ontario), an island of Ontario, Canada
 Black Island, Georgia, U.S.
 Black Island, Missouri, U.S.
 Black Island, the name of several islands of the United States
 Black Island, Estero Bay (Florida), U.S.
 Black Island, Lake Memphremagog, U.S.

South America
Isla Negra (Black island), Chile

Oceania
 Black Island (Tasmania), Australia
 Black Island, Whitsunday Islands, Queensland, Australia

Other uses
 "Black Island" (song), a 1999 song by Cuba
 Black Island (film), a 2021 German film
 The Black Island, a comic book in the Adventures of Tintin series, about a fictional island off the coast of Scotland

See also 

 Black Isle, a peninsula in Scotland
 Eilean Dubh (disambiguation) (Scottish Gaelic for 'Black Island')
 Kara Ada (disambiguation) (Turkish for 'Black Island')